Nazario Escoto Donaire was acting President of  "Democratic" Nicaragua after the death of Francisco Castellón during Granada-León civil war.

Year of birth missing
Year of death missing
Presidents of Nicaragua